Cantina Mariachi is a chain of franchised casual restaurants with a Mexican-style theme. It belongs to the Comess Group.

Chronology
1993
Berdejo family opens first restaurant in Zaragoza, Spain
1999
In June, start of international expansion with opening in Lisbon, Portugal
As new units are launched, corporate umbrella is formed named Restmon
2002
Restmon faces serious financial problems and looks for a buyer.
In October, an association of franchisees sues Restmon for disloyal competition and misapplication of co-op marketing funds, among other allegations.
2003
In August, the chain was sold to newly formed company Comess, headed by Manuel Robledo and Luis Irisarri.
2004
In June, new restaurant decoration unveiled
In July, court rules in favor of Comess regarding the October 2002 lawsuit
2005
By July, 122 restaurants in total
2006
By April, 104 restaurants in Spain and 15 in other countries (total 119)

External links

Mariachi
Restaurant chains
Restaurant franchises
Restaurants in Portugal
Restaurants in Spain
Mexican restaurants
Restaurants established in 1993
1993 establishments in Spain